Valiollah Khakdan (1923, Baku, Azerbaijan – 1996, Tehran, Iran) was an Iranian art director. He graduated from the faculty of painting at the Art School in Baku Azerbaijan and started his career as an art director with Prince's Prisoner (1998, E. Koushan). He immigrated to Iran in 1938. Due to his background in painting, he became a set designer in theatres of Tabriz. He is known as a pioneer of set designing in Iranian cinema. He moved to Tehran in 1946 and worked in the bigger theatres. Although he had a limited experience and background in Iranian cinema, made some decorations for historical films which are among the memorable and outstanding examples. He was one of the supervisors for building a small town for IRIB as the location of historical films and TV series.

Some of his works:
 Golden Dreams, 1951
 The Mother, 1952
 Shepherd's Daughter
 Intrigue
 Tehran Nights
 Negligence
 Missing
 Mashdi Ebaad, 1953
 Eagle of Tous
 The Bride of Tigris, 1954
 Fabulous Amir Arsalan (first version), 1955
 Yousuf and Zoleikha (first version), 1956
 Ladder of Progress
 Jacob Leis, 1957
 Bizhan and Manizheh
 Ray of Hope
 The Broken Spell, 1958
 Spring of Life Water, 1959
 Arshin Malalan, 1960
 You Have Mistaken Me, Madam!
 Bitter Honey
 Midnight's Cry, 1961
 Aras Khan, 1963 
 Fabulous Amir Arsalan (second version)
 Hossein Kurd Shabestary, 1966
 Diamond 33
 Nasim Ay'yar, 1987
 Dragon Cape
 Yousuf and Zoleikha (second version), 1968
 Breed of Braves, 1969
 Leili and Madjnoun, 1970
 Abbaseh and Djafar Barmaki, 1972
 The Sleeping Lion, 1977
 Kamalolmolk, 1984
 Mirza Norouz's Shoes, 1985
 The First Deputy, 1986
 The Magnificent Day (co), 1988 
 Great Expectation
 Kakado (co), 1994

Iranian film directors
Artists from Baku
1923 births
1996 deaths
Azerbaijani emigrants to Iran